In Real Time: Live '87 is a 1987 album by British folk rock band Fairport Convention. Although appearing (especially from the cover) to consist of recordings of concert performances, the album was largely recorded at The Mill studio, Farnham, Buckinghamshire, with audience responses dubbed on later, reputedly taken from a recording of a John Martyn concert.

The "Live '87" part of the title was justified by having the songs recorded "as live" in the studio, with all the band members playing at once rather than laying down their parts individually.

Reception

Track listing

Side one
 "Reynard the Fox" (Traditional) - 2.52
 "The Widow of Westmoreland's Daughter"/"Random Jig"  (Traditional/James Hill) - 4.44
 "The Hiring Fair" (Dave Mattacks, Ralph McTell)  - 6.35
 "Crazy Man Michael"  (Richard Thompson, Dave Swarbrick) - 4.49

Side two
 "Close to the Wind" (Stuart Marson) - 6.20
 "Big Three Medley": ("The Swirling Pit"/"Matty Groves"/"The Rutland Reel"/"Sack the Juggler")  (Dave Pegg/Traditional/Ric Sanders/Ric Sanders) - 10:41
 "Meet on the Ledge" (Richard Thompson) - 4:09

Personnel
Fairport Convention 
 Simon Nicol - vocals, electric & acoustic guitars
 Ric Sanders - violin, keyboards
 Maartin Allcock - vocals, electric & acoustic guitars, bouzouki, bass
 Dave Pegg - bass, mandolin, drums, vocals
 Dave Mattacks - drums, keyboards

Production personnel
 Lee Hambling – assistant engineer
 Stuart Epps – mixing, recording
 Dave Mattacks – producer, keyboards on "Close to the Wind"
 Robin Black –  mixing and recording of "Meet on the Ledge"

Release history
Island Records ILPS 9883 (LP, UK, December 1987)
Island Records 90678-1 (LP, UK, January 1988)
Island Records IMCD 10 (CD, UK, June 1990)

References

Fairport Convention albums
1987 albums
Island Records albums